The Dickinson Webster House is a historic residence located in Osceola, Iowa, United States.  The Webster family moved from Delaware and settled in Franklin Township, Clarke County, Iowa in 1851. They were among the earliest settlers in the county.  Dickinson Webster, Jr. moved to Osceola in 1854, and built this house about 1860.  He owned  of farmland, and established a nursery in 1869.  The  frame structure follows a rectangular plan, and is capped with a gable roof.  Ornate millwork and classical influences in the porch columns adds decorative elements to an otherwise simple house.  The house was listed on the National Register of Historic Places in 1996.

References

Houses completed in 1860
Osceola, Iowa
Houses in Clarke County, Iowa
Houses on the National Register of Historic Places in Iowa
National Register of Historic Places in Clarke County, Iowa